Le Bestov is a compilation album by French duo Les Rita Mitsouko. Limited quantities came with an accompanying DVD of videos.

Track listing

DVD Track listing
 "Marcia Baïla"
 "Andy"
 "Les Histoires d'A"
 "C'est Comme Ça"
 "Singing in the Shower"
 "Le Petit Train"
 "Hip Kit (William Orbit Remix)"
 "Les Amants"
 "Y'a d'La Haine"
 "Cool Frénésie"
 "Alors C'est Quoi"

References

Les Rita Mitsouko albums
2001 video albums
Music video compilation albums
2001 compilation albums
Virgin Records compilation albums
Virgin Records video albums